Stade Louis Ganivet is a multi-use stadium in Faaa, Tahiti, in French Polynesia.  It is currently used mostly for football matches and hosts the home matches of AS Tefana of the Tahiti Division Fédérale.  The stadium holds 5,000 spectators.

References

Football venues in French Polynesia
Sport in Tahiti